Janet Vera Street-Porter  (née Bull; born 27 December 1946 – is an English broadcaster, journalist, writer, and media personality. She began her career as a fashion writer and columnist at the Daily Mail and was later appointed fashion editor of the Evening Standard in 1971. In 1973, she co-presented a mid-morning radio show with Paul Callan on LBC.

Street-Porter began working on television at London Weekend Television in 1975, first as a presenter of a series of mainly youth-oriented programmes. She was the editor and producer of the Network 7 series on Channel 4 in 1987, and was a BBC Television executive from 1987 until 1994. She was an editor of The Independent on Sunday from 1999 until 2002, but relinquished the job to become editor-at-large. 

Since 2011, Street-Porter has been a regular panellist on the ITV talk show Loose Women. Her other television appearances include Question Time (1988–2015), Have I Got News for You (1996–2022), I'm a Celebrity... Get Me Out of Here! (2004), Deadline (2007), Celebrity MasterChef (2013, 2020), and A Taste of Britain (2014–present).

Street-Porter was appointed a Commander of the Order of the British Empire (CBE) in the 2016 Birthday Honours for services to journalism and broadcasting.

Early life
Street-Porter was born in Brentford, Middlesex (now in the London Borough of Hounslow). She is the daughter of Stanley W. G. Bull, an electrical engineer who had served as a sergeant in the Royal Corps of Signals in World War II and Cherry Cuff Ardern (née Jones) who was Welsh and worked as a school dinner lady and in the civil service as a clerical assistant in a tax office. Her mother was still married to her first husband, George Ardern, at the time, and was not to marry Stanley until 1954, hence her name being recorded thus in the birth records. She was later to take her father's surname.

Street-Porter grew up in Fulham, West London and Perivale, Middlesex, after the family moved there when she was 14 and the family would stay in her mother's home town of Llanfairfechan in North Wales for their holidays. She attended Peterborough Primary and Junior Schools in Fulham and Lady Margaret Grammar School for Girls (now Lady Margaret School) in Parsons Green from 1958 to 1964 where she passed 8 O-levels and 3 A-levels in English, History and Art. She also took an A-level in pure mathematics but did not pass the exam. Whilst studying A-levels, she had an illegal abortion. She then spent two years at the Architectural Association School of Architecture, where she met her first husband, photographer Tim Street-Porter.

Career
Street-Porter began her career as a fashion writer and columnist on the Daily Mail, and was appointed as the newspaper's deputy fashion editor in 1969 by Shirley Conran. She subsequently became fashion editor of the Evening Standard in 1971. When the London Broadcasting Company (LBC) local radio station began to broadcast in 1973, Street-Porter co-presented a mid-morning show with Fleet Street columnist Paul Callan. The intention was sharply to contrast the urbane Callan and the urban Street-Porter. Their respective accents became known to the station's studio engineers as "cut-glass" and "cut-froat". Friction between the ill-matched pair involved constant one-upmanship.

In early 1975, Street-Porter was launch editor of Sell Out, an offshoot of the London listings magazine Time Out, with its publisher and her second husband, Tony Elliott. The magazine was not a success.

Television
Street-Porter began to work in television at London Weekend Television (LWT) in 1975, first as a reporter on a series of mainly youth-oriented programmes, including The London Weekend Show (1975–79), then went on to present the late-night chat show Saturday Night People (1978–80) with Clive James and Russell Harty. She later produced Twentieth Century Box (1980–82), presented by Danny Baker.

Street-Porter was editor of the Network 7 series on Channel 4 from 1987. In the same year, BBC2 controller Alan Yentob appointed her to become head of youth and entertainment features, making her responsible for the twice-weekly DEF II. She commissioned Rapido, Red Dwarf and Rough Guide. She was responsible for the cancellation of the long-running music series The Old Grey Whistle Test. Her Network 7 show was awarded a BAFTA for its graphics in 1988.

In 1992, Street-Porter provided the story for The Vampyr: A Soap Opera, the BBC's adaptation of Heinrich August Marschner's opera Der Vampyr, which featured a new libretto by Charles Hart. Street-Porter's approach did not endear her to critics, who objected to her diction and questioned her suitability as an influence on Britain's youth. In her final year at the BBC, she became head of independent commissioning. She left the BBC for Mirror Group Newspapers in 1994 to become joint-managing director with Kelvin MacKenzie of the ill-fated L!VE TV channel. She left after four months. In 1996, Street-Porter established her own production company. Since 1996, Street-Porter has appeared several times on the BBC panel show Have I Got News for You, most recently in May 2020. From 1998 until 2015 (except 2013), Street-Porter appeared annually on BBC's Question Time.

In 2000, Street-Porter was nominated for the "Mae West Award for the Most Outspoken Woman in the Industry" at Carlton Television's Women in Film and Television Awards. In 2007, Street-Porter starred in an ITV2 reality show called Deadline, serving as a tough-talking editor who worked with a team of celebrity "reporters" whose job it was to produce a weekly gossip magazine. The celebrities in question had to endure the Street-Porter tongue as she decided each week which of them to fire.

In 2011, Street-Porter became a regular panellist on ITV's chat show Loose Women. In 2013, she appeared in Celebrity MasterChef reaching the final three, and returned again for a Christmas special in 2020, in which she was crowned the winner. She also appeared in the television show QI. Since 1 September 2014, Street-Porter has co-hosted BBC One cookery programme A Taste of Britain with chef Brian Turner and ran for 20 episodes in one series.

Street-Porter has appeared on many reality TV shows, including Call Me a Cabbie and So You Think You Can Teach; the latter saw her trying to work as a primary school teacher. She conducted numerous interviews with business figures and others for Bloomberg TV.

Newspaper work
Street-Porter became editor of The Independent on Sunday in 1999. Despite derision from her critics, she took the paper's circulation up to 270,460, an increase of 11.6 per cent. In 2001, Street-Porter became editor-at-large, as well as writing a weekly column and regular features.

Editor-at-large column
Following the death of Ian Tomlinson, Street-Porter dedicated her editor-at-large column in The Independent on Sunday to painting a picture of Tomlinson as a "troubled man with quite a few problems":Knowing that he was an alcoholic is critical to understanding his sense of disorientation and his attitude towards the police, which might on first viewing of the video footage, seem a bit stroppy.

Other activities
A rambler, Street-Porter was president of the Ramblers' Association for two years from 1994. She walked across Britain from Dungeness in Kent to Conwy in Wales for the television series Coast to Coast in 1998. Street-Porter also walked from Edinburgh to London in a straight line in 1998, for a television series and her book, As the Crow Flies. In 1994, for the documentary series The Longest Walk, Street-Porter visited long-distance walker Ffyona Campbell on the last section of her round-the-world walk.

In 1966, Street-Porter appeared as an extra in the nightclub scene in Blowup, dancing in a silver coat and striped trousers. In 2003, she wrote and presented a one-woman show at the Edinburgh Festival titled All the Rage. She published the autobiographical Baggage in 2004, about her childhood in working class London. Its sequel is titled Fallout. Life's Too F***ing Short is a volume which presents, as she puts it, her answer to "getting what you want out of life by the most direct route."

Personal life

While studying architecture, she married fellow student and photographer Tim Street-Porter. They were together until 1975 when she went on to marry Time Out editor Tony Elliot. Her third marriage was to film director Frank Cvitanovich, who was 19 years her senior, before her final brief marriage in her fifties to the 27-year-old David Sorkin. Before marrying Sorkin, she lived with DEF II presenter Normski for four years.

She is now in a relationship with restaurateur Peter Spanton. She has no children. She currently lives in Haddiscoe in Norfolk, Kent and London. She previously had a home in Nidderdale, North Yorkshire. An active member of the Nidderdale community, she contributed her time and energy to a number of local causes. She was the president of the Burley Bridge Association, leading a campaign for a crossing over the River Wharfe linking North and West Yorkshire.

Health
During the COVID-19 pandemic, Street-Porter regularly appeared as a guest on This Morning to review the political decisions taken by the government alongside Matthew Wright, via video call from her home in Kent.

Street-Porter was diagnosed with skin cancer in January 2020. On 23 June 2020, she announced her news on Loose Women from home via video call because of COVID-19 restrictions.

Filmography

Television

Film

Bibliography 
 Scandal! (1981)
The British Teapot (1983)
 Coast to Coast with Janet Street-Porter (1998)
As the Crow Flies: A Walk from Edinburgh to London - in a Straight Line (1998)
Baggage: My Childhood (2004)
The Walk of Life (2005)
Fall Out (2007)
Life's Too F***ing Short (2008)
Don't Let the B*****ds Get You Down (2009)

Honours and awards 
Street-Porter was appointed Commander of the Order of the British Empire (CBE) in the 2016 Birthday Honours for services to journalism and broadcasting.

References

External links
 
 
 
 Desert Island Discs episode, BBC Radio 4, November 2008
 Janet Street-Porter 2008 Interview

1946 births
Living people
Alumni of the Architectural Association School of Architecture
BAFTA winners (people)
BBC executives
British women columnists
British women television producers
Commanders of the Order of the British Empire
Daily Mail journalists
English fashion journalists
English people of Welsh descent
English television executives
English television presenters
English television producers
English women journalists
GMTV presenters and reporters
I'm a Celebrity...Get Me Out of Here! (British TV series) participants
Journalists from London
People educated at Lady Margaret School
People from Fulham
People from Parsons Green
People from South Norfolk (district)
Television personalities from London
The Independent on Sunday editors
Walkers of the United Kingdom
Women newspaper editors
Women autobiographers